Progres 2 is an art rock band from Brno, Czech Republic. It was established in 1968, known as Progress Organization, by Zdeněk Kluka, Pavel Váně, Jan Sochor and Emanuel Sideridis. Its most important album in a Czech context was the rock opera project Dialog s vesmírem (Dialog with The Universe) in 1978, only a year after the transformation of the band called Bardonaj to the new band Progres 2. The public presentation of this rock opera was the first audiovisual program of rock music in Czechoslovakia, inspired by the British rock group Pink Floyd. Because this rock band played in the totalitarian state, they had a few troubles with officials. The best known problem was the one with lyrics of one song from the album Dialog s vesmírem. The song was called "Planeta Hieronyma Bosche" (The Planet of Hieronymus Bosch) where the band sings about life on heroin. Censors forbade this song and the band solved it by using only the vowels from the original lyrics. At concerts they played the whole original lyrics.

Personnel
 PROGRESS ORGANIZATION (1968–1976)
Zdeněk Kluka (drums, vocals), Pavel Váně (guitar, vocals), Jan Sochor (keyboard, vocals), Emanuel Sideridis (bass guitar, vocals)

 BARNODAJ (1976–1978)
Pavel Váně (guitar, vocals), Pavel Pelc (bass guitar, vocals), Zdeněk Kluka (drums, vocals), Jan Sochor (keyboard, vocals)

 PROGRES 2 – DIALOG S VESMÍREM (1978)
Pavel Váně (guitar, vocals), Pavel Pelc (bass guitar, vocals), Daniel Forró (keyboard), Zdeněk Kluka (drums, vocals), Miloš Morávek (guitar)

 PROGRES 2 – TŘETÍ KNIHA DŽUNGLÍ (1981)
Zdeněk Kluka (drums, vocals), Pavel Pelc (bass guitar, keyboard, vocals), Miloš Morávek (guitar), Roman Dragoun (keyboard, vocals)

 PROGRES 2 – MOZEK (1984)
Peter Peteraj (guitar), Aleš Bajger (guitar, vocals), Zdeněk Kluka (drums, vocals), Pavel Pelc (bass guitar, keyboard, vocals)

 PROGRES 2 – ZMĚNA (1987)
Pavel Pelc (bass guitar, keyboard, vocals), Milan Nytra (keyboard), Aleš Bajger (guitar, vocals), Zdeněk Kluka (drums, vocals)

 PROGRES – POKROK – OTRAVA KRVE (1987)
Pavlína Dvořáčková (vocals), Mirek Sova (guitar), Dalibor Dunovský (bass guitar), Milan Nytra (keyboard), Zdeněk Kluka (drums, vocals)

 PROGRES – 1992
Pavel Váně (guitar, vocals), Pavel Pelc (bass guitar, vocals), Zdeněk Kluka (drums, vocals), Borek Nedorost (keyboard, vocals), Ivan Manolov (guitar)

 PROGRES – 2004
Pavel Váně (guitar, vocals), Pavel Pelc (bass guitar, vocals), Zdeněk Kluka (drums, vocals), Borek Nedorost (keyboard, vocals)

 PROGRES – 2008 – present
Pavel Váně (guitar, vocals), Zdeněk Kluka (drums, vocals), Miloš Morávek (guitar), Roman Dragoun (keyboard, vocals), Borek Nedorost (keyboard, vocals) 

Pavel Pelc (bass guitar, vocals) died in 2021 aged 71.

Discography
 Barnodaj (1971, Progress Organization)
 Mauglí (1976, Barnodaj)
 Dialog s vesmírem (1980, Progres 2)
 Třetí kniha džunglí (1983, Progres 2)/The Third Book Of Jungle – English version
 Mozek (1984, Progres 2)
 Změna (1987, Progres 2)
 Otrava krve (1989, Progres – Pokrok)
 Progres story 1968–2008 (2008, Progres)

External links
 Official website
 Progres Story 1968–2008 – 40 year anniversary concert of Progres 2
 Planeta Hieronyma Bosche with original lyrics
 Planeta Hieronyma Bosche with changed vowel lyrics

1968 establishments in Czechoslovakia
Musical groups established in 1968
Czech art rock groups
Czech progressive rock groups